Piqua High School is a public high school in Piqua, Ohio, United States, and is the only high school in the Piqua City Schools district. The current high school was completed in 1981 and sits adjacent to Alexander Stadium, completed in 2001. The school's athletic teams are known as the Indians, and the school colors are red and blue. Piqua's longstanding high school rivals are the Troy Trojans and the Sidney Yellow jackets, both schools from neighboring communities. The school includes 9th to 12th grade, with approximately 930 students enrolled. As of 2019–20, Piqua is a member of the Miami Valley League (MVL)

OHSAA State championships
 Football – 2006

Notable alumni
 Kenneth W. Benner, Brigadier general in the Marine Corps and World War II veteran
 Kristin King, ice hockey bronze medal winner in 2004
 Quinn Pitcock, professional football player in the National Football League (NFL) 
 Brandon Saine, professional football player in the NFL
 Joseph J. Spengler, economist, statistician, and historian of economic thought

See also
 Old Piqua High School

References

External links
 

High schools in Miami County, Ohio
Public high schools in Ohio